Yevgeniya Voloshenko (born 3 April 1979) is a Kazakhstani cross-country skier. She competed in three events at the 2006 Winter Olympics.

References

External links
 

1979 births
Living people
Sportspeople from Kokshetau
Kazakhstani female cross-country skiers
Olympic cross-country skiers of Kazakhstan
Cross-country skiers at the 2006 Winter Olympics
21st-century Kazakhstani women